Crnik is a village in the municipality of Pehčevo, North Macedonia. It is located close to the Bulgarian border.

Demographics
According to the 2002 census, the village had a total of 707 inhabitants. Ethnic groups in the village include:

Macedonians 103
Turks 326
Serbs 4
Romani 267
Others 7

References

Villages in Pehčevo Municipality